Climate Central is a nonprofit news organization that analyzes and reports on climate science. Composed of scientists and science journalists, the organization conducts scientific research on climate change and energy issues, and produces multimedia content that is distributed via their website and media partners. Climate Central has been featured in many prominent U.S. news sources, including The New York Times, the Associated Press, Reuters, NBC Nightly News, Time, National Public Radio, PBS, Scientific American, and The Washington Post.

Climate Central's President, CEO and Chief Scientist is Benjamin Strauss (elected April 2018 to replace Paul Hanle).

History

At a 2005 conference sponsored by the Yale School of Forestry and Environmental Studies and held in Aspen, Colorado, more than a hundred scientists, policymakers, journalists, and leaders from business, religion and civil society identified the critical need for a central authoritative source for climate change information. A broad group of climate experts later confirmed this need during a November 2006 New York meeting convened by James Gustave Speth, Dean of the Yale School of Forestry and Environmental Studies. At roughly the same time, in Palo Alto, California, The 11th Hour Project began organizing with the mission to popularize reliable information about global warming solutions, using the power of Silicon Valley scientists, entrepreneurs, and inventors.

Inspired the idea for Climate Central, which took shape early in 2008 with seed money from The Flora Family Foundation and development funds from 11th Hour Project. The founding board included Jane Lubchenco, Steven Pacala and Wendy Schmidt.

Climate Central also sponsors classes for meteorologists and provides climate graphics to television stations. This has been credited in part for the increase in acceptance of climate change science among local forecasters and their willingness to share it in their broadcasts.

See also
Scientific opinion on climate change
Public opinion on climate change
Climate change denial

References

External links
 Official site – contains original multimedia content on climate change, including daily news and blogs, long form video, Web videos, and infographics.
 News Content News stories on climate change produced by Climate Central - contains original content produced by Climate Central staff and media partners.
 Funding - information on Climate Central's funders.
 Board Members - information about Climate Central's Board of Directors.

Climatological research organizations
Climate change organizations based in the United States